Dariusz Drelich (born 10 July 1967) is a Polish businessman and politician that has served as voivode of Pomeranian Voivodeship since 8 December 2015.

Biography 

Dariusz Drelich was born on 10 July 1967 in Kolbudy, graduating in Organization and Management at the University of Gdańsk and completing post-graduate studies at the Gdańsk University of Technology and the WSB University in Gdańsk. 

He joined the Liberal Democratic Congress in 1990, a heavy proponent of Donald Tusk's ideas at the time, and was a councilman of Gmina Kolbudy from 1990 to 1994 and of Gdańsk County from 2014, as well as the representative of Law and Justice in Pomeranian Voivodeship, joining the party in 2005. He was appointed Voivode of Pomeranian Voivodeship on 8 December 2015 by Beata Szydło.

During his time as voivode, Drelich experienced conflict with the majority liberal government of the voivodeship and thus limited or delayed most reforms suggested by the local government, causing his term in office to be rather controversial, an effect made worse by him implementing the reforms of his parent party, PiS. As a businessman, he co-founded the metal trade and manufacturing company POMKOL (Przesiębiorstwo Usługowo-Produkcyjno-Handlowe Pomkol sp. z o.o.) in January 2002 and is the active owner of the company.

Personal life 

He is married to Małgorzata Drelich and has two daughters: Roma and Nina, 23 and 11 years old respectively. He currently lives in Lublewo Gdańskie.

References 

People from Gdańsk County
Politicians from Gdańsk
Living people
1967 births
Law and Justice politicians
Liberal Democratic Congress politicians